Khamis Esmaeel (born 16 August 1989, Ras al-Khaimah) is an Emirati professional footballer plays for Al Bataeh. He plays as a midfielder for Al-Bataeh and United Arab Emirates national football team. He competed at the 2012 Summer Olympics.

International career

International goals
Scores and results list the United Arab Emirates' goal tally first.

Honours
United Arab Emirates
 Gulf Cup of Nations: 2013
AFC Asian Cup third-place: 2015

References

1989 births
Living people
Emirati footballers
Olympic footballers of the United Arab Emirates
Footballers at the 2012 Summer Olympics
2015 AFC Asian Cup players
2019 AFC Asian Cup players
Emirates Club players
Al Jazira Club players
Al Ahli Club (Dubai) players
Shabab Al-Ahli Club players
Al-Wasl F.C. players
Al Wahda FC players
Al Bataeh Club players
United Arab Emirates international footballers
Association football midfielders
UAE First Division League players
UAE Pro League players
People from the Emirate of Ras Al Khaimah